Marka may refer to:

Places
 Marka (river), Lower Saxony, Germany
 Marka, Iran, a village in South Khorasan Province
 Marka, Malawi a town in Nsanje District
 Marka district, Jordan
 Marka refugee camp, a Palestinian refugee camp in Jordan
 Marka International Airport, an alternative name for Amman Civil Airport in Jordan
 Marka, Oslo, the area surrounding Oslo, Norway
 Marka (launch site), a missile launch site in Norway
 Merca (Somali: Marka), a port city in Somalia

Currency
 Bosnia and Herzegovina convertible mark (konvertibilna marka), the currency of Bosnia and Herzegovina
 Polish mark (marka polska), the currency of the Kingdom of Poland and the Republic of Poland between 1917 and 1924

People
 Marka people, a people of Mali in Western Africa
 Marka Gjoni (1861–1925), Albanian chieftain
 Marka (singer) (born 1961), Belgian singer, songwriter, composer and film-maker Serge Van Laeken
 Saskia Marka (born 1975), German film title designer
 Sebastian Marka (born 1978), German film director and editor

Other uses
 Marka language, the language of the Marka people
 Publishing and Trade Centre "Marka", a Russian postage stamp publisher and distributor
 Márka, a Hungarian soft drink

See also
 Finnish markka, the currency of Finland from 1860 until 28 February 2002
 Maraka (disambiguation)
 Markas, a male Lithuanian given name